Roy Dickinson (born ) is an English former professional rugby league footballer who played in the 1980s and 1990s, and coached in the 1990s.

Playing career
Roy Dickinson was born in Leeds, West Riding of Yorkshire, England.

International honours
Roy Dickinson won caps for Great Britain while at Leeds in 1985 against France (2 matches).

Challenge Cup Final appearances
Roy Dickinson played as an interchange/substitute (replacing  Stanley Fearnley) in Leeds' 16-7 victory over Widnes in the 1977 Challenge Cup Final during the 1976–77 season at Wembley Stadium, London on Saturday 7 May 1977, in front of a crowd of 80,871, and was an interchange/substitute in the 14-12 victory over St. Helens in the 1978 Challenge Cup Final during the 1977–78 season at Wembley Stadium, London on Saturday 13 May 1978, in front of a crowd of 96,000.

County Cup Final appearances
Roy Dickinson played as an interchange/substitute, i.e. number 15, (replacing  Steve Pitchford ) in Leeds' 15-11 victory over Hull Kingston Rovers in the 1975 Yorkshire County Cup Final during the 1975–76 season at Headingley Rugby Stadium, Leeds on Saturday 15 November 1975, played left-, i.e. number 8, in the 15-6 victory over Featherstone Rovers in the 1976 Yorkshire County Cup Final during the 1976–77 season at Headingley Rugby Stadium, Leeds on Saturday 16 October 1976, and played right- in the 15-6 victory over Halifax in the 1979 Yorkshire County Cup Final during the 1979–80 season at Headingley Rugby Stadium, Leeds on Saturday 27 October 1979.

John Player Trophy Final appearances
Roy Dickinson played left-, i.e. number 8, in Leeds' 4-15 defeat by Wigan in the 1982–83 John Player Trophy Final during the 1982–83 season at Elland Road, Leeds on Saturday 22 January 1983.

Testimonial match
Roy Dickinson's Testimonial match at Leeds took place in 1982.

References

External links
!Great Britain Statistics at englandrl.co.uk (statistics currently missing due to not having appeared for both Great Britain, and England)
Maurice Bamford column

1956 births
Living people
Bramley R.L.F.C. coaches
English rugby league coaches
English rugby league players
Great Britain national rugby league team players
Leeds Rhinos players
Rugby league props
Rugby league players from Leeds